Yauwan is an Indian film from 1973 which stars Anil Dhawan, Yogeeta Bali, Sujit Kumar, and Kabir Bedi.

Plot
When Shashi's (Yogeeta Bali) health is threatened, her family seeks answers from physicians—who suggest that her illness's origins are psychological. As her condition soon worsens, her desperate family finds a psychiatrist, Dr. Prem (Anil Dhawan) who helps her, and she gradually improves. In the process, Shashi and Dr. Prem fall madly in love.

External links

1973 films
1970s Hindi-language films